Großkrotzenburg Power Station (German: Kraftwerk Staudinger) is a modern coal-fired thermal power station in Großkrotzenburg, Hesse, east of Frankfurt, Germany. It comprises five units with a total capacity of approximately 1900 MW. The units were built between 1965 and 1992. Units 1-3 were decommissioned in 2012 and 2013. A characteristic of this power station is the fact that the most recently built unit, Unit 5, uses the updraught from the existing cooling towers as stack.  The power station is operated by Uniper.

Technical Information 
Großkrotenzburg Power Station consists of 5 units, of which only Unit 5 is operated regularly. A 6th unit was planned, but was cancelled in 2012 for economic reasons.

External links

 Plant datasheet

References

Coal-fired power stations in Germany
Buildings and structures in Main-Kinzig-Kreis
Uniper